Srinagar (English:) is the largest city and the summer capital of Jammu and Kashmir, India. It lies in the Kashmir Valley on the banks of the Jhelum River, a tributary of the Indus, and Dal and Anchar lakes. The city is known for its natural environment, gardens, waterfronts and houseboats. It is known for traditional Kashmiri handicrafts like the Kashmir shawl (made of pashmina and cashmere wool), and also dried fruits. It is the 31st-most populous city in India, the northernmost city in India to have over one million people, and the second-largest metropolitan area in the Himalayas (after Kathmandu, Nepal).

Origin of name 
The earliest records, such as Kalhana's Rajatarangini, mentions the Sanskrit name shri-nagara which have been interpreted distinctively by scholars in two ways: one being sūrya-nagar, meaning "City of the Surya" (trans) "City of Sun"  and other being "The city of "Shri" (श्री), the Hindu goddess of wealth, meaning "City of Lakshmi".

History: Srinagar after 1980

In 1989, Srinagar became the focus of the Insurgency in Jammu and Kashmir. The area continues to be a highly politicised hotbed of separatist activity with frequent spontaneous protests and strikes ("bandhs" in local parlance). The city saw increased violence against minorities, particularly the Kashmiri Hindus, starting from mid-1980s and resulting in their ultimate exodus. Posters were pasted to walls of houses of Hindus, telling them to leave or die, temples were destroyed and houses burnt; but a very small minority of Hindus still remains in the city. Kashmiri Hindus constituted 21.9% of Srinagar's population as per 1891 census and 2.75% as per 2011 census.

On 19 January 1990, the Gawakadal massacre of at least 50 unarmed protestors by Indian forces, and up to 280 by some estimates from eyewitness accounts, set the stage for bomb blasts, shootouts, and curfews that characterised Srinagar throughout the early and mid-1990s.  As a result, bunkers and checkpoints are found throughout the city, although their numbers have come down in the past few years as militancy has declined. However, frequent protests still occur against Indian rule, such as the 22 August 2008 rally in which hundreds of thousands of Kashmiri civilians protested against Indian rule in Srinagar. Similar protests took place every summer for the next 4 years. In 2010 alone 120 protesters, many of whom were stone pelters and arsonists, were killed by police and CRPF. Large scale protests were seen following the execution of Afzal Guru in February 2013. In 2016, after the death of militant leader Burhan Wani, there were mass protests in the valley and about 87 protesters were killed by Indian Army, CRPF and police in the 2016 Kashmir unrest.

After revocation of the special status of Jammu and Kashmir and the subsequent devolution of the state into a union territory in August 2019, a lockdown was imposed in Kashmir, including in Srinagar. This lockdown continued for more than 15 months till 5 February 2021. Thousands, including three former chief ministers - Farooq Abdullah, Omar Abdullah and Mehbooba Mufti - were detained for an extended period. The Union Government announced the restoration of 4G mobile internet in Kashmir, including Srinagar, on 15 February 2021.

Geography

The city is located on both the sides of the Jhelum River, called Vyath in Kashmir. The river passes through the city and meanders through the valley, moving onward and deepening in the Wular Lake. The city is known for its nine old bridges, connecting the two parts of the city.

There are a number of lakes and swamps in and around the city. These include the Dal, the Nigeen, the Anchar, Khushal Sar, Gil Sar and Hokersar.

Hokersar is a wetland situated near Srinagar. Thousands of migratory birds come to Hokersar from Siberia and other regions in the winter season. Migratory birds from Siberia and Central Asia use wetlands in Kashmir as their transitory camps between September and October and again around spring. These wetlands play a vital role in sustaining a large population of wintering, staging and breeding birds.

It is the most accessible and well-known of Kashmir's wetlands which include Hygam, Shalibug and Mirgund. A record number of migratory birds have visited Hokersar in recent years.

Birds found in Hokersar are migratory ducks and geese which include brahminy duck, tufted duck, gadwall, garganey, greylag goose, mallard, common merganser, northern pintail, common pochard, ferruginous pochard, red-crested pochard, ruddy shelduck, northern shoveller, common teal, and Eurasian wigeon.

Climate
Under the Köppen climate classification, Srinagar has a temperate humid subtropical climate (Cfa) with hot summers and mild winters, and slight continental influences due to its elevation. The valley is surrounded by the Himalayas on all sides. Moderate to heavy snowfall occurs in winter and the highway connecting Srinagar with the rest of India faces frequent blockades due to icy roads, landslides and avalanches. Spring is the wettest season while autumn is the driest.

Economy

In November 2011, the City Mayors Foundationan advocacy think tankannounced that Srinagar was the 92nd fastest growing urban areas in the world in terms of economic growth, based on actual data from 2006 onwards and projections to 2020.

Tourism
Srinagar is one of several places that have been called the "Venice of the East". Lakes around the city include Dal Lakenoted for its houseboats and Nigeen Lake. Apart from Dal Lake and Nigeen Lake, Wular Lake and Manasbal Lake both lie to the north of Srinagar. Wular Lake is one of the largest fresh water lakes in Asia.

Srinagar has some Mughal gardens, forming a part of those laid by the Mughal emperors across the Indian subcontinent. Those of Srinagar and its close vicinity include Chashma Shahi (the royal fountains); Pari Mahal (the palace of the fairies); Nishat Bagh (the garden of spring); Shalimar Bagh; the Naseem Bagh.
Jawaharlal Nehru Memorial Botanical Garden is a botanical garden in the city, set up in 1969. The Indian government has included these gardens under "Mughal Gardens of Jammu and Kashmir" in the tentative list for sites to be included in world Heritage sites.

The Sher Garhi Palace houses administrative buildings from the state government. Another palace of the Maharajas, the Gulab Bhavan, has now become the Lalit Grand Palace hotel.

The Shankaracharya Temple lies on a hill top in the middle of the city.

Government and politics
The city is run by the Srinagar Municipal Corporation (SMC) under the leadership of a Mayor. The Srinagar district along with the adjoining Budgam and Ganderbal districts forms the Srinagar Parliamentary seat.

Stray dog controversy
Srinagar's city government attracted brief international attention in March 2008 when it announced a mass poisoning program aimed at eliminating the city's population of stray dogs. Officials estimate that 100,000 stray dogs roam the streets of the city, which has a human population of just under 900,000. In a survey conducted by an NGO, it was found that some residents welcomed this program, saying the city was overrun by dogs, while critics contended that more humane methods should be used to deal with the animals.

The situation has become alarming with local news reports coming up at frequent intervals highlighting people, especially children being mauled by street dogs.

Demographics

As of 2011 census Srinagar urban agglomeration had 1,273,312 population. Both the city and the urban agglomeration has average literacy rate of approximately 70%. The child population of both the city and the urban agglomeration is approximately 12% of the total population. Males constituted 53.0% and females 47% of the population. The sex ratio in the city area is 888 females per 1000 males, whereas in the urban agglomeration it is 880 per 1,000. The predominant religion of Srinagar is Islam with 96% of the population being Muslim. Hindus constitute the second largest religious group representing 2.75% of the population. The remaining population constitutes Sikhs, Buddhist and Jains. Kashmiri Hindus constituted 21.9% of Srinagar's population as per 1891 census and 2.75% as per 2011 census.

Transport

Road
The city is served by many highways, including National Highway 1A and National Highway 1D.

Air
Sheikh ul-Alam International Airport has regular domestic flights to Leh, Jammu, Chandigarh, Delhi and Mumbai and occasional international flights. An expanded terminal capable of handling both domestic and international flights was inaugurated on 14 February 2009 with Air India Express flights to Dubai. Hajj flights also operate from this airport to Saudi Arabia.

Rail

The railway track also connects to Banihal across the Pir Panjal mountains through a newly constructed 11 km long Banihal tunnel, and subsequently to the Indian railway network after a few years. It takes approximately 9 minutes and 30 seconds for a train to cross the tunnel. It is the longest rail tunnel in India. This railway system, proposed in 2001, is not expected to connect the Indian railway network until 2017 at the earliest, with a cost overrun of 55 billion INR.
The train also runs during heavy snow.

There are proposals to develop a metro system in the city. The feasibility report for the Srinagar Metro is planned to be carried out by Delhi Metro Rail Corporation.

Cable car

In December 2013, the 594m cable car allowing people to travel to the shrine of the Sufi saint Hamza Makhdoom on Hari Parbat was unveiled. The project is run by the Jammu and Kashmir Cable Car Corporation (JKCCC), and has been envisioned for 25 years. An investment of 300 million INR was made, and it is the second cable car in Kashmir after the Gulmarg Gondola.

Boat
Whilst popular since the 7th century, water transport is now mainly confined to Dal Lake, where shikaras (wooden boats) are used for local transport and tourism. There are efforts to revive transportation on the River Jhelum.

Culture

Like the territory  of Jammu and Kashmir, Srinagar too has a distinctive blend of cultural heritage. Holy places in and around the city depict the historical cultural and religious diversity of the city as well as the Kashmir valley.

Places of worship
There are many religious holy places in Srinagar. They include:
 Hazratbal Shrine, only domed mosque in the city.
 Jama Masjid, Srinagar, one of the oldest mosques in Kashmir
 Khanqah-e-Moula, first Islamic centre in Kashmir
 Aali Masjid, in Eidgah Locality
 Hari Parbat hill hosts shrine of Sharika Mata temple
 Zeashta Devi Shrine a holy shrine for Kashmiri Hindus
 Shankaracharya temple
 Gurdwara Chatti Patshahi
 Pathar Masjid
 All Saints Church, Srinagar
 Holy Family Catholic Church (Srinagar)

Additional structures include the Dastgeer Sahib shrine, Mazar-e-Shuhada, Roza Bal shrine, Khanqah of Shah Hamadan, Pathar Masjid ("The Stone Mosque"), Hamza Makhdoom shrine, tomb of the mother of Zain-ul-abidin, tomb of Pir Haji Muhammad, Akhun Mulla Shah Mosque, cemetery of Baha-ud-din Sahib, tomb and Madin Sahib Mosque at Zadibal. Apart from these, dozens of smaller mosques are located all over the city. Several temples and temple ghats are located on the banks of river Jhelum in Srinagar, including Shurayar temple, Gadhadhar temple, Pratapishwar temple,  Ganpatyar Ganesh temple, Purshyar temple, Sheshyar temple, Raghunath Mandir, Durga Patshala and Dhar temple. Gurdwaras are located in Rainawari, Amira Kadal, Jawahar Nagar, Mehjoor Nagar, Shaheed Gunj, Maharajpur and Indra Nagar areas of the city. There are three Christian churches in Srinagar.

The Sheikh Bagh Cemetery is a Christian cemetery located in Srinagar that dates from the British colonial era. The oldest grave in the cemetery is that of a British colonel from the 9th Lancers of 1850 and the cemetery is valued for the variety of persons buried there which provides an insight into the perils faced by British colonisers in India. It was damaged by floods in 2014. It contains a number of war graves. The notable interments here are Robert Thorpe and Jim Borst.

Performing arts

Education

Srinagar is home to various premiere Higher Education Institutes including the University of Kashmir, the Cluster University of Srinagar, Central University of Kashmir besides the National Institute of Technology Srinagar formerly known as Regional Engineering College (REC Srinagar). Most of these are among the oldest and earliest Institutions of the country including the University of Kashmir dating back to 1948 while the National Institute of Technology Srinagar was established during the second Five year plan. The educational institutions in the City include:

Schools
 Tyndale Biscoe School
 Presentation Convent Higher Secondary School
 Burn Hall School
 Khalsa High School, Srinagar
 Mallinson Girls School
 Delhi Public School, Srinagar
 Woodlands House School
 Little Angels High School, Srinagar
 Green Valley Educational Institute

Medical colleges
 Government Medical College, Srinagar
 SMHS Hospital
 Sher-i-Kashmir Institute of Medical Sciences

Universities
 University of Kashmir
 Sher-e-Kashmir University of Agricultural Sciences and Technology of Kashmir
 Central University of Kashmir
 Cluster University of Srinagar

General degree colleges
 Amar Singh College
 Sri Pratap College
 Islamia College of Science and Commerce, Srinagar

Broadcasting 
Srinagar is broadcasting hub for radio channels in UT which are Radio Mirchi 98.3FM, Red FM 93.5 and AIR Srinagar. State television channel DD Kashir is also broadcast.

Sports

The city is home to the Sher-i-Kashmir Stadium, where international cricket matches have been played.
The first international match was played in 1983 in which West Indies defeated India and the last international match was played in 1986 in which Australia defeated India by six wickets. Since then no international matches have been played in the stadium due to the security situation (although the situation has now improved quite considerably). Srinagar has an outdoor stadium namely Bakshi Stadium for hosting football matches. It is named after Bakshi Ghulam Mohammad. The city has a golf course named Royal Springs Golf Course, Srinagar located on the banks of Dal lake, which is considered one of the best golf courses of India. Football is also followed by the youth of Srinagar and TRC Turf Ground is maintained for the particular sports recently. Srinagar is the home of professional football club Real Kashmir FC, which competes in I-League. There are certain other sports being played but those are away from the main city like in Pahalgam (Water rafting) and Gulmarg (skiing).

Notable people
 Joanna Lumley (1946–present)
 Agha Shahid Ali (1949–2001)
 Bakshi Abdur Rashid (1923–1977)
 Pandit Jia Lal Saraf, sanskrit scholar

See also 
 Kashmir conflict
 Downtown (Srinagar)
 Kashmir Shaivism
 List of State Protected Monuments in Jammu and Kashmir
 List of colleges in Srinagar
 Lal Chowk

References

Bibliography
 Hewson, Eileen. (2008) Graveyards in Kashmir India. Wem, England: Kabristan Archives.

External links

 
 Srinagar district administration
 Official website of Jammu and Kashmir 
 Delhi to Srinagar train

 
Metropolitan cities in India
Cities and towns in Srinagar district

Indian union territory capitals
Cities in Jammu and Kashmir